Waakirchen is a municipality  in the district of Miesbach in Bavaria in Germany.  At the end of World War II, Japanese American soldiers (Nisei from the 522nd_Field Artillery Battalion) rescued concentration camp victims on a death march at this village.

References

Miesbach (district)